Pavai College of Technology (PCT) was started in 2009. It is the third engineering college of Paavai Institutions. It is affiliated to Anna University of Technology, Coimbatore and part of the Paavai Institutions along with Paavai College of Engineering, Paavai Engineering College and Paavai School of Engineering. It is accredited by the National Board of Accreditation (NBA).

Paavai College of Technology has four branches: EEE, ECE, Civil Engineering and Mechanical Engineering.

The college's Techmandra'11 is a symposium which is scheduled for 17 February 2011.

References

External links
 

Engineering colleges in Tamil Nadu
Colleges affiliated to Anna University
Education in Namakkal district
Educational institutions established in 2009
2009 establishments in Tamil Nadu